Joseph Barnett (25 May 1858 – 29 November 1926), also known by his nicknames Danny Barnett and “Joe”, was a fish porter who worked at Billingsgate Market in the 19th century, located in the East End of London, and later became known for being the roommate of Mary Jane Kelly. It was not suspected that he had murdered her and, even less, that he was Jack the Ripper, until the 1970s, when he was added to the growing list of more than 100 people that someone has speculated could be Jack the Ripper.

Biography 
Joseph Barnett was born on 25 May 1858 in Whitechapel's Hairbrain neighbourhood. He was the fourth child of dock worker John Barnett and his wife, Catherine, Irish immigrants who fled their native country for Great Britain following the great famines. The Barnetts already had a son before they moved to Whitechapel, Denis, and went on to have three other children (excluding Joseph) - Daniel (b. 1851), Catherine (b. 1853) and John (b. 1860).

In 1861, the family moved to nearby Cartwright Street, and they lived there until 1864, when the elder Barnett, who worked as a porter in the Billingsgate Fish Market, died of pleurisy in July. His eldest son Denis assumed responsibility as head of the family, although he married Mary An Garrett and settled in Bermondsey.

Before he turned 20, Joseph began working in the Billingsgate Market as a fish porter, a job he held for more than a decade, although intermittently, until he was terminated in October 1888, when he was 30 years old and already lived with a woman, also from Ireland: Mary Jane Kelly. Barnett also worked briefly as a Horse slaughterer in the Kings Cross area for a short period.

Little is known about Barnett's life after Kelly's death. He only reappears in a register in 1906, when he was granted a license as a doorman, again in the Billingsgate Market. At that time he lived at Number 18 of New Lane Gravel, Shadwell, with his brother Daniel. The following year his work license says that he lived at Number 60 Red Lion Street, Shadwell, and in 1908 he lived in Tencas Street, in the district of Wapping.

After this, in 1919 he appeared in the electoral register living at 106 Red Lion Street in Shadwell with Louisa Barnett, who appears to be his wife, although there is no documented evidence to confirm whether he was married or had any children with her. The couple remained there until Louisa's death on 3 November 1926. Shortly thereafter, it is recorded that Joseph Barnett died on 29 November 1926, at the age of 68. The cause of death was edema in the lungs and acute bronchitis.

Relationship with Mary Jane Kelly 
Joseph Barnett was Mary Jane Kelly's roommate until days before she was brutally murdered on Friday 9 November 1888. He was 30 years old in 1888 and had worked as a fish porter at the Billinsgate Fish Market in London's East End, though he had reportedly been fired earlier in the year, which may have been why Kelly had resorted to prostitution. He occasionally also worked as a construction worker. The pair had rented the small room of 13 Miller's Court at 26 Dorset Street, Spitalfields. 

On 30 October that year, he had separated from Kelly after a violent fight, potentially due to his disapproval of the people whom she associated with as a prostitute. During the fight blunt objects had been thrown, resulting in the glass of the window adjacent to the door that entered the house being broken.

Barnett later testified that despite the separation, they saw each other again outside Miller's Court several times after he had moved out, though only as friends. Both he and Kelly adopted, from then on, the custom of introducing the arm through the broken window in order to open the porch from the inside, pushing the inner bolt, since they had lost the only key and had no money to manufacture a copy. Barnett also stated that on the night of 8 November, the evening of Kelly's murder, he had visited her for around one hour.

That version seemed incongruous and aroused distrust among the investigators. If Barnett had stopped living with Kelly, his claim that they both opened the keyless door by using the procedure he described was not understood. However, Barnett explained that, despite their confrontation, they remained on cordial terms, to the point that when he got a new job, he offered financial assistance to Kelly. Some witnesses apparently confirmed Barnett's claims, having seen the couple drinking in a tavern in the company of Julia Venturney, another resident of Miller's Court.

In the subsequent judicial survey conducted after the murder of Mary Jane Kelly, he was called to the stand as a witness. Once there, he said he could recognise Kelly, despite the dire state of the body, by the shape of her eyes and ears. After that statement, Barnett supplied to the justice most of the little information known about Kelly's life.

Connection to Jack the Ripper 
Even though the contemporary investigators did not suspect that this individual had consummated any murder, in more recent times he was accused of being the sordid killer by more than one scholar. The suspicions initially fell on Joseph Barnett in 1972 when, in an article edited by True Crime magazine, former British detective Bruce Paley suggested that he was Jack the Ripper.

Years later, in a book published in 1995 titled "Jack the Ripper: The Simple Truth", that same author resumed the theory by adding new speculation to endorse the candidacy of the fish porter from the Billinsgate Fish Market.

Essentially, he proclaimed Barnett passionately loved his "girlfriend" Mary Jane Kelly, although many say that they weren't even in a relationship, just roommates, and that Joseph was secretly in love with Mary. One time, Joseph even called Mary Jane Kelly "wife", even though they weren't married. Joseph was desperate to get Mary Jane Kelly away from prostitution and alcoholism. In order to frighten her so that she would abandon her dissolute lifestyle, and in order to permanently settle in with him, he devoted himself to brutally decimating her colleagues.

Barnett also used to read the press reports to his "partner", and she frequently asked him if police had captured the perpetrator. The plan seemed successful, as the frightened young woman stopped walking the streets for a while. But at the end of October, Mary went on to share her room with another prostitute named Maria Harvey, with whom Paley suggested Kelly had a lesbian relationship. This situation stoked the ire of Barnett, who decided to leave her after a fiery fight on 30 October 1888.

According to this theory, after some frustrated attempt at reconciliation, Joseph arrived unexpectedly the night of 9 November at his former lover's room. Soon after, the final arguing began. Noting the definitive rejection from Kelly, and taken over by uncontrollable jealousy and rage, he proceeded to kill her as well.

A number of arguments have been highlighted in support of the hypothesis that blames Joseph Barnett for the murders, namely:

1) He would have kept the key to the room he shared with Kelly and, after completing the homicide, went out and locked the door using that key, which had not been lost, as he falsely claimed.

2) His physiognomy resembled the person who was described accompanying some victims before their murder; above all, age and height match.

3) He dwelt in the center of the Whitechapel district in 1888, when the crimes occurred.

4) He most likely met the other murdered women, who would've let their guard down in his presence, a circumstance that explains why they did not defend themselves when attacked.

5) It was learned, and he admitted it himself to the authorities, that days before the murder, he had quarreled with Mary Jane Kelly.

6) It was speculated that Catherine Eddowes suspected he was the killer, as she told one pensioner. Her murder could've been consummated to eliminate a dangerous witness.

7) After Annie Chapman's death, an envelope that belonged to Barnett was found in the courtyard of Hanbury Street, who could've have lost it when he committed the murder.

8) He was of Irish origin, so he could've written the "From Hell" letter addressed to George Lusk, which contained idioms from that language.

9) As a fish porter, he filleted fish and possessed an appropriate weapon that matched the knife with which the killer inflicted the cuts to his numerous victims.

10) On 30 September 1888, the night of the "double event", the escape route taken by the murderer led to Barnett's home. He could even have washed his bloody hands in a fountain near Miller's Court, where he lived at the time.

11) A tobacco pipe of his was found on the scene of Mary Jane Kelly's murder. If he had taken all of his belongings a few days before and no longer returned to the place, as he had said, it is not explained why this object was there.

12) He had a reason to perpetrate the excesses of Jack the Ripper. He was not alienated or psychotic, but an intelligent and cunning individual who - precisely because of these characteristics - the police never managed to catch.

Comparison of Barnett's psychological profile and the FBI's profile of the murderer

See also 
Jack the Ripper suspects

References

External links 
 Article by Dr. Frederick Walker, Joseph Barnett, on the digital site Casebook: Jack the Ripper.
 Joseph Barnett (1858-1926), suspect, on the digital site Casebook: Jack the Ripper.
 Joseph Barnett, on the Wiki Jack the Ripper: The Great Victorian Mystery.
 The Ripper Theory: Joseph Barnett.

1858 births
1926 deaths
Deaths from pulmonary edema
Deaths from bronchitis
Jack the Ripper suspects
People with speech impediment
English people of Irish descent
People from Whitechapel